Stone of Silver Creek is a 1935 American Western film directed by Nick Grinde, written by Earle Snell, and starring Buck Jones, Noel Francis, Niles Welch, Marion Shilling, Peggy Campbell and Murdock MacQuarrie. It was released on April 15, 1935, by Universal Pictures.

Plot

Cast 
Buck Jones as T. William Stone 
Noel Francis as Lola
Niles Welch as Rev. Timothy Tucker
Marion Shilling as Martha Mason
Peggy Campbell as Nancy Raymond
Murdock MacQuarrie as George J. Mason
Rodney Hildebrand as Fred Graves
Harry Semels as R. J. Simmons
Grady Sutton as Jimmy
Kernan Cripps as Ben 
Frank Rice as Tom Lucas

References

External links
 

1935 films
1930s English-language films
American Western (genre) films
1935 Western (genre) films
Universal Pictures films
Films directed by Nick Grinde
American black-and-white films
1930s American films